Agostinelli is a surname. Notable people with the name include:

 Alejandro Agostinelli, Argentine journalist
 Alessandro Agostinelli (born 1965), Italian writer and journalist 
 Andrea Agostinelli (born 1957), Italian footballer and coach
 Bruno Agostinelli (1987–2016), Canadian tennis player
 Cataldo Agostinelli (1894–1988), Italian mathematician
 Donatella Agostinelli (born 1974), Italian politician
 Franco Agostinelli (born 1944), Italian prelate
 Massimo Agostinelli (born 1987), Swiss based Italian American artist
Nathan G. Agostinelli (born 1930), American politician
 Robert Agostinelli, American billionaire
 Sal Agostinelli (born 1961), American baseball player, coach, and scout